Banjdol is a populated settlement in the Mostar municipality, Herzegovina-Neretva Canton, Federation of Bosnia and Herzegovina, Bosnia and Herzegovina. It is situated southeast of the city of Mostar.

Demographics 
According to the 2013 census, its population was 72, all Bosniaks.

References

Populated places in Mostar
Villages in the Federation of Bosnia and Herzegovina